Westerkwartier is a municipality in the Netherlands, in the province of Groningen.

The municipality was formed on 1 January 2019, by the merger of the municipalities of Grootegast, Leek, Marum,  Zuidhorn and partly Winsum.

References

External links

Official website

 
Municipalities of Groningen (province)
Municipalities of the Netherlands established in 2019